Lower Moutere is a settlement in the Tasman District of New Zealand's upper South Island. It is a farming community it the Lower Moutere valley,  from Motueka closed to the Moutere Inlet.

The road up the valley from Motueka to Upper Moutere is an alternative to the main State Highway 60 route between Nelson and Motueka.

The Riverside Community was established in Lower Moutere in 1941 by a small group of Methodist pacifists, and continues to operate a dairy farm and cafe. As of 2013 about 24 people were permanent members and 19 children lived there, but the community’s population sometimes doubled due to visitors, including WWOOFers (Willing Workers on Organic Farms).

The Lower Moutere Memorial Hall features a plaque commemorating the three local men who died and 35 local men who served overseas during World War II. A memorial gate commemorates those who died or were served during World War I.

Moutere is the Māori word for 'island'.

Native birds are common in the area, and a kākā was found in the area in January 2020.

Demographics 

Lower Moutere had a population of 1,683 at the 2018 New Zealand census, an increase of 174 people (11.5%) since the 2013 census, and an increase of 309 people (22.5%) since the 2006 census. There were 597 households. There were 876 males and 807 females, giving a sex ratio of 1.09 males per female. The median age was 44 years (compared with 37.4 years nationally), with 297 people (17.6%) aged under 15 years, 261 (15.5%) aged 15 to 29, 864 (51.3%) aged 30 to 64, and 261 (15.5%) aged 65 or older.

Ethnicities were 88.6% European/Pākehā, 9.8% Māori, 4.8% Pacific peoples, 2.7% Asian, and 1.8% other ethnicities (totals add to more than 100% since people could identify with multiple ethnicities).

The proportion of people born overseas was 26.6%, compared with 27.1% nationally.

Although some people objected to giving their religion, 62.2% had no religion, 27.6% were Christian, 0.2% were Hindu, 0.2% were Muslim, 0.7% were Buddhist and 2.7% had other religions.

Of those at least 15 years old, 231 (16.7%) people had a bachelor or higher degree, and 255 (18.4%) people had no formal qualifications. The median income was $29,400, compared with $31,800 nationally. The employment status of those at least 15 was that 717 (51.7%) people were employed full-time, 258 (18.6%) were part-time, and 42 (3.0%) were unemployed.

Education

The school opened in 1857. A fire destroyed four classrooms and other facilities in 1990.

References

Populated places in the Tasman District
Populated places around Tasman Bay / Te Tai-o-Aorere